The 1996–97 Romanian Hockey League season was the 67th season of the Romanian Hockey League. Six teams participated in the league, and SC Miercurea Ciuc won the championship.

Regular season

External links 
 Season on hockeyarchives.info

Romanian Hockey League seasons
Romanian
Rom